Methon, an ancestor of Orpheus, was considered the founder of Methone in Pieria.

References

External links
 A Geographical and Historical Description of Ancient Greece By John Anthony Cramer page 216

Pierian mythology